Jerrabattgulla Creek, a perennial stream of the Shoalhaven River catchment, is located in the Southern Tablelands region of New South Wales, Australia.

Course and features
The river flows generally southeast and then north northeast, joined by one minor tributary before reaching its confluence with the Shoalhaven River near Togganoggera, east of Captains Flat. The river descends  over its  course.

See also

 Rivers of New South Wales
 List of rivers of New South Wales (A-K)
 List of rivers of Australia

References

External links
 

Rivers of New South Wales
Southern Tablelands